Longjiang station, is a station on Line 4 of the Nanjing Metro, named after the unofficial local name for the surrounding neighborhood. It is the western terminus of Phase I of Line 4, which opened on January 18, 2017, alongside seventeen other stations. On its first day of passenger service, Longjiang station carried 10,680 people, more than any of the other new stations that also opened that day. The station is oriented on an east–west axis, underneath the intersection of Lijiang Road and Caochangmen Street, and has a total of 9 exits.

Longjiang station will also be a transfer station for the planned Line 9 of the Nanjing Metro.

References

Railway stations in Jiangsu
Railway stations in China opened in 2017
Nanjing Metro stations